Diss or DISS may refer to:
Diss, Alberta, a place in Canada
Diss, Norfolk, a market town in England, United Kingdom
Diss railway station
Diss Rugby Club
Diss Town F.C.
Diss grass, a Mediterranean grass
Diss (music), a song whose primary purpose is to verbally attack someone else, usually another artist
Department of Internal State Security, a fictional organization from the 2009 film District 13: Ultimatum
Directorate of Intelligence and Security Services, Botswana, an intelligence agency
Smaïl Diss (born 1976), Algerian football player
Dissertation

See also

Dis (disambiguation)
Disrespect